Codonanthopsis elegans is a plant species in the family Gesneriaceae. It is native to Belize.

References 

Gesnerioideae
Plants described in 1984
Flora of Belize